Palos de la Frontera (known as Palos de Moguer before 2022) is an administrative neighborhood (barrio) of Madrid belonging to the district of Arganzuela.

References 

Wards of Madrid
Arganzuela